Mountain Standard Time is an American bluegrass fusion band from Nederland, Colorado.  The sextet is composed of Stan Sutton on guitar, mandolin and vocals; Nick Dunbar on mandolin, guitar and vocals; Adam Pause on banjo and vocals; Jeff "Curly Collins" Schroeder on bass and vocals; Kyle Stersic on saxophone and electronic wind instruments; and Zach Scott on drums.  The band is managed by Brian Heisler. Originally formed in 2006, the band has undergone several line-up changes, before settling into its current form in the fall of 2010. They released their self-titled debut album, recorded by Grammy-award winner David Glasser in February 2011 in support of their second annual "Mardi-Grass" celebration at the Fox theater in Boulder, Colorado.

History 
Mountain Standard Time was originally formed as a four piece string band, composed of Adam Pause on banjo, Stan Sutton on mandolin and guitar, Curly Collins on bass, and Phillip Dyer on mandolin and guitar.  At the time, all four were living in the town of Nederland, Colorado; known for its local music scene, and home to artists such as The String Cheese Incident, Yonder Mountain String Band, and Vince Herman (of Leftover Salmon and Great American Taxi fame). They soon set themselves apart from the crowded local music scene by staging impromptu acoustic sets outside venues after shows, having musical parades down the streets and fostering an expansion of the roots music scene in the community. Early in their career the band created a word of mouth buzz that continues to define them by playing a busy schedule of live performances.  Notably, these performances included shows at the Pioneer Inn, First Street Pub and the Stage Stop.  As is common with bands that fall under the label of "jambands", they were a "taper friendly" band from the start and have encouraged the taping and dissemination of their live performances.  Many of these early shows can still be found on Live Music Archive to this day.

2008-Present 

Due to series of chance meetings early in 2008, the Mountain Standard Time line-up began to change, their popularity grew and Mountain Standard Time began to imprint their brand of bluegrass, which they call "non-linear aquatic gypsy-grass", on the minds of an ever growing audience. They began to play up and down Colorado's Front Range, throughout the state and beyond. However, their biggest break most likely came in 2009, when they played their first Halloween show with Michael Kang (of String Cheese Incident fame).  It was at this show that the band first teamed up with Conscious alliance, exchanging limited edition artwork for food drive donations, which they have continued to do at various shows. The following February, they played the first of their now annual Mardi-Grass celebrations to sold out audiences at the Fox in Boulder, Colorado. From there, they seem to have parlayed that success into landing slots on many of the summer festival scene's most prestigious events, most notably, Wakarusa in Arkansas, Summer Camp in Illinois and the 10,000 Lakes festival in Minnesota. In addition, they now have a busy, national touring schedule consisting of over 100 shows a year and have received glowing reviews from critics and fans alike.

References 
 Anderson, Fallon. "Mountain Standard Time releases debut album" Marquee Magazine. February 1, 2011. http://marqueemag.com/2011/02/01/mountain-standard-time/
 "It's Time for Mountain Standard Time" WCF Courier Online April 15, 2011. http://wcfcourier.com/entertainment/music/article_8063adbe-66b2-11e0-8133-001cc4c03286.html
 Inglis, Nicole. "Mountain Standard Time Bluegrass Band Returns to Steamboat" Explore Steamboat Online January 13, 2011. http://www.exploresteamboat.com/news/2011/jan/13/mountain-standard-time-bluegrass-group-returns-ste/
 Boniface, Erica. "Mountain Standard Time" Denver Metromix October 23, 2008. http://denver.metromix.com/music/article/mountain-standard-time/708672/content
 Libby, Same. "Mountain Standard Time Cd Review" The Mountain Ear. http://www.themountain-ear.com/index.php?option=com_content&view=article&id=129:mountain-standard-time-cd-review&catid=14:mountain-music&Itemid=55

External links 
 
 Live recordings of MST at the Internet Archive
 Mountain Standard Time ReverbNation profile

Musical groups from Colorado
Progressive bluegrass music groups
American bluegrass music groups
2006 establishments in Colorado
Musical groups established in 2006